The Elliott House is a house located in north Portland, Oregon listed on the National Register of Historic Places.

See also
 National Register of Historic Places listings in North Portland, Oregon

References

1902 establishments in Oregon
Houses completed in 1902
Houses on the National Register of Historic Places in Portland, Oregon
Queen Anne architecture in Oregon
Overlook, Portland, Oregon